The 2007–08 European Challenge Cup was the 12th year of the European Challenge Cup, the second tier rugby union cup competition below the Heineken Cup. The tournament was held between November 2007 and May 2008.

Pool stage

Pool 1

Pool 2

Pool 3

Pool 4

Pool 5

Seeding and runners-up

Knockout stage

Quarter-finals

Semi-finals

Final

See also
European Challenge Cup
2007-08 Heineken Cup

External links
2007/08 European Challenge results

 
2007-08
2007–08 rugby union tournaments for clubs
2007–08 in European rugby union
2007–08 in Irish rugby union
2007–08 in English rugby union
2007–08 in Spanish rugby union
2007–08 in French rugby union
2007–08 in Italian rugby union
2007–08 in Romanian rugby union